Verticordia multiflora is a flowering plant in the myrtle family, Myrtaceae and is endemic to the south-west of Western Australia. It is a small, openly branched shrub with small leaves and groups of scented, bright yellow flowers on the ends of the branches in spring or early summer.

Description

Flowering time is from October to January, depending on subspecies.

Taxonomy and naming
Verticordia multiflora was first formally described by Nikolai Turczaninow in 1847 from a specimen collected by James Drummond and the description was published in Bulletin de la Société Impériale des Naturalistes de Moscou. The specific epithet (multiflora) is a Latin word meaning "many-flowered".

There are two subspecies:

When Alex George reviewed the genus Verticordia in 1991, he placed this species in subgenus Verticordia, section Pilocosta along with V. huegelii and V. brachypoda.

Distribution and habitat
This verticordia usually grows in sand, sometimes with clay or decomposing granite, often with other species of Verticordia in woodland and shrubland. The two subspecies have different distributions in the south-west.

Conservation
Subspecies solox  is classified as  "Priority Two" by the Western Australian Government Department of Parks and Wildlife meaning that it is poorly known and from only one or a few locations but subspecies muliflora is classified as "Not Threatened".

Use in horticulture
Both subspecies of this verticordia have been propagated from cuttings and successfully grown in gardens but are inclined to attack by fungus. A better understanding of its requirements is needed before it is available in general horticulture.

References

muelleriana
Rosids of Western Australia
Eudicots of Western Australia
Plants described in 1847
Taxa named by Nikolai Turczaninow